Easterling may refer to:

a surname, see Easterling (surname)
The Easterling, a former express passenger train in London, England
a member of a people in J. R. R. Tolkien's Middle-earth, see Easterling (Middle-earth)
Easterling Correctional Facility, a men's prison located in Clio, Barbour County, Alabama
an antiquated term for Baltic merchants who trade in sterling silver

See also
Easterlin